The Sharps Formation is a geologic formation in South Dakota. It preserves fossils dating back to the Paleogene.

The Sharps Formation is the namesake of the community of Sharps Corner, South Dakota.

Fossil content

Mammals

Carnivorans

Eulipotyphlans

Lagomorphs

Metatherians

Primates

Rodents

Ungulates

Reptiles

Squamates

See also

 List of fossiliferous stratigraphic units in South Dakota
 Paleontology in South Dakota

References

 

Paleogene geology of South Dakota